Esenburun is a village in the Bitlis District of Bitlis Province in Turkey.

References

Villages in Bitlis District